Coalville is a town in Leicestershire, England.  Coalville may also refer to:

Coalville, a housing estate at Weston Coyney, Stoke-on-Trent, England
Coalville, Iowa, a census-designated place in the United States
Coalville, Utah, a small city in the United States
Coalville, Victoria, Australia